Leon Claire Metz (November 6, 1930 – November 15, 2020) was an American cultural historian, author, television documentary personality, and lecturer on the American Old West period. Metz presented hundreds of his programs to groups all over the U.S. particularly in Texas, New Mexico, Arizona. Metz also made numerous TV appearances television documentaries most notably, A&E's The Real West series, which is also shown on The History Channel.

Early life and career
Metz was born in Parkersburg, West Virginia, and graduated from Parkersburg High School in 1948. He then joined the US Air Force during the Korean War. He was primarily stationed at Biggs Army Airfield in El Paso, where he was a propeller mechanic, attaining the rank of staff sergeant, which he would later portray in his book Fort Bliss: An Illustrated History. C.L. "Doc" Sonnichsen a noted historian himself, would serve as an early mentor for the young Metz.

Literary and other works

Metz wrote between fifteen and nineteen books, most notably John Selman: Texas Gunfighter and a biography of Old West lawman Pat Garrett. Metz also hosted a weekly column in the El Paso Times and hosted a radio show, The Leon Metz Show on KTSM, which related to Southwestern U.S. history. He was often seen on BBC television specials about the west. On June 16, 2012, Metz contributed his voice to an alternative hip hop album entitled Greetings from El Paso, a concept album about El Paso, Texas by local rapper Zyme One.

Awards

He was the 2010 Winner of the Ruth Lester Lifetime Achievement Award from the Texas Historical Commission.  This award recognizes an individual who has made a significant, long-term contribution to historic preservation in Texas.

In 1985, he was awarded the Saddleman Award.

Personal life and death
Metz, who lived in El Paso, Texas, since the days after his graduation from high school, was married to the former Cheryl Schilling, a speech therapist for autistic children. They have four adult children. 

Leon Metz died from complications of COVID-19 in El Paso on November 15, 2020. He had Alzheimer's disease.

References

External links

 
 

1930 births
2020 deaths
United States Air Force personnel of the Korean War
American columnists
21st-century American historians
21st-century American male writers
Cultural historians
Historians of the American West
Historical preservationists
Parkersburg High School alumni
People from El Paso, Texas
People from Parkersburg, West Virginia
Television personalities from West Virginia
United States Air Force airmen
University of Texas at El Paso people
Writers from West Virginia
Journalists from Texas
Deaths from the COVID-19 pandemic in Texas
Historians from Texas
American male non-fiction writers